American rapper and songwriter Pop Smoke has released two studio albums, two mixtapes, three extended plays, nineteen music videos, twenty-eight singles (including six as a featured artist), and three promotional singles. Pop Smoke began his music career in 2018 when visiting a Brooklyn recording studio with fellow rapper Jay Gwuapo. After Gwuapo got inebriated on drugs and fell asleep, Pop Smoke went into a booth to try rapping for the first time. He used a beat he got from English producer 808Melo and used American rapper Sheff G's song "Panic Part 3". He recorded his debut single titled "Mpr (Panic Part 3 Remix)". Pop Smoke rose to fame with the release of his breakout single "Welcome to the Party" in April 2019. Two remixes of the song were later recorded, with one featuring Nicki Minaj and the other featuring Skepta.

In July 2019, Pop Smoke released his debut mixtape Meet the Woo, which included "Welcome to the Party". The rapper collaborated with JackBoys and Travis Scott on "Gatti", which debuted and peaked at number 69 on the US Billboard Hot 100, giving Pop Smoke his first Hot 100 hit. On February 7, 2020, Pop Smoke released his second mixtape Meet the Woo 2. The mixtape reached number seven on the US Billboard 200, giving him his first top-10 hit in the United States. Less than two weeks after the release of Meet the Woo 2, Pop Smoke was fatally shot during a home invasion in Los Angeles. "Dior", the third single off Meet the Woo, became his first posthumous solo hit, peaking at number 22 on the Billboard Hot 100 and number 33 on the UK Singles Chart.

After Pop Smoke's death, 50 Cent announced he was going to be executive producing his debut studio album. On July 3, 2020, Victor Victor Worldwide and Republic Records released Shoot for the Stars, Aim for the Moon. It debuted at number one on the Billboard 200 with first-week sales of 251,000 album-equivalent units, giving Pop Smoke his first number one hit in the US. It made Pop Smoke the first hip hop act to posthumously debut at number one on the Billboard 200 with a debut studio album. He joined The Notorious B.I.G., 2Pac, XXXTentacion, and Juice Wrld as the only hip hop acts to posthumously hit number one. Additionally, all 19 tracks on the album charted on the Billboard Hot 100 following its first week of release. The album spawned six singles, including two Billboard Hot 100 top-10 hits: "For the Night" and "What You Know Bout Love". Pop Smoke's second studio album, Faith, his second posthumous project, was released on July 16, 2021. The album debuted at number one on the US Billboard 200 and gave the late rapper his second US number-one hit. Pop Smoke became the first artist in history to have his first two albums posthumously debut at number one on the Billboard 200.

Albums

Studio albums

Mixtapes

EPs

Singles

As lead artist

As featured artist

Promotional singles

Other charted and certified songs

Guest appearances

Music videos

Notes

References

External links
 
 
 
 

Discographies of American artists